Bryaninops natans, known commonly as the redeye goby, is a species of marine fish in the family Gobiidae.

The redeye goby is widespread throughout the tropical waters of the Indo-Pacific area, including Red Sea.

B. natans is a small size that can reach a maximum size of 2.5 cm length.

References

External links
 

natans
Fish described in 1985
Taxa named by Helen K. Larson